The Netherlands Football League Championship 1937–1938 was contested by 51 teams participating in five divisions. The national champion would be determined by a play-off featuring the winners of the eastern, northern, southern and two western football divisions of the Netherlands. Feijenoord won this year's championship by beating Heracles, DWS, Be Quick 1887 and PSV Eindhoven.

New entrants
Eerste Klasse East:
Promoted from 2nd Division: HVV Hengelo
Eerste Klasse North:
Promoted from 2nd Division: sc Heerenveen
Eerste Klasse South:
Promoted from 2nd Division: Willem II
Eerste Klasse West-I:
Moving in from West-II: DWS, KFC, Sparta Rotterdam VSV and VUC
Promoted from 2nd Division: RFC Rotterdam
Eerste Klasse West-II:
Moving in from West-I: Blauw-Wit Amsterdam, CVV Mercurius, DHC Delft, Stormvogels and Xerxes
Promoted from 2nd Division: HVV 't Gooi

Divisions

Eerste Klasse East

Eerste Klasse North

Eerste Klasse South

Eerste Klasse West-I

Eerste Klasse West-II

Championship play-off

References
RSSSF Netherlands Football League Championships 1898-1954
RSSSF Eerste Klasse Oost
RSSSF Eerste Klasse Noord
RSSSF Eerste Klasse Zuid
RSSSF Eerste Klasse West

Netherlands Football League Championship seasons
Neth
Neth